The Essence of Mystery is the debut album by American jazz drummer Alphonse Mouzon recorded in 1972 and released in 1973 on the Blue Note label.

Reception
The AllMusic review by Ron Wynn awarded the album 3 stars stating "Some frenetic drumming and good jazz/rock arrangements".

Track listing
All compositions by Alphonse Mouzon
 "The Essence of Mystery" - 4:55
 "Funky Finger" - 3:40
 "Crying Angels" - 5:23
 "Why Can't We Make It" - 3:27
 "Macrobian" - 5:14
 "Spring Water" - 6:27
 "Sunflower" - 4:27
 "Thank You Lord" - 4:02
 "Antonia" - 4:40
Recorded at A&R Studios in New York City on December 13, 14 & 15, 1972

Personnel
Alphonse Mouzon  - drums, timpani, tabla, percussion, electric piano, clavinet, Mellotron, vocals
Buddy Terry - soprano saxophone
Sonny Fortune - alto saxophone
Larry Willis - piano, electric piano
Buster Williams - bass
Wilbur Bascomb Jr. - electric bass

References

Blue Note Records albums
Alphonse Mouzon albums
1973 debut albums